Miguel Urdaneta Fernández Airport  is an airport serving Santa Bárbara del Zulia, a city in Zulia State, Venezuela. It is also known as Santa Bárbara del Zulia Airport. The airport is operated by the Instituto Autónomo de Aeropuertos del Estado Zulia (IAAEZ).

The Santa Barbara Del Zulia non-directional beacon (Ident: STB) and VOR-DME (Ident: STB) are located on the field.

Airlines and destinations

See also
Transport in Venezuela
List of airports in Venezuela

References

External links 
OurAirports - Santa Bárbara del Zulia
OpenStreetMap - Santa Bárbara del Zulia
SkyVector - Santa Bárbara del Zulia
 

Airports in Venezuela
Buildings and structures in Zulia